State Route 123 (SR 123) is a short state route in the U.S. state of Tennessee.  It serves to link SR 68 with NC 294, at the Tennessee/North Carolina state line.

Route description
SR 123 is a short  highway entirely in Polk County and Cherokee National Forest.  Two-lane throughout and no shoulders, it servers primarily as a link, with NC 294, to connect travelers from Turtletown and Farner, in Tennessee, to Murphy and the Hiwassee Dam, in North Carolina.

History

Junction list

References

External links
 

123
Transportation in Polk County, Tennessee